Aminullah, also spelled Aminallah, Aminollah or Ameenullah is a male Muslim given name composed from the elements Amin and Allah. It may refer to

Aminoullah Husseinoff, later known as André Hossein (1905–1983), Iranian/French composer
Aminullah Amin, Pakistani held in Guantanamo

See also
Amanullah

Arabic masculine given names